Atanu Sabyasachi Nayak is a politician from Odisha, India. He was the Health Minister in Odisha Legislative Assembly. He is an MLA representing Mahakalapada constituency from the Biju Janata Dal. He was inducted into Naveen Patnaik's Cabinet as Food Supplies and Consumer Welfare, Cooperation Minister in June 2022.

References 

Living people
Members of the Odisha Legislative Assembly
Biju Janata Dal politicians
Year of birth missing (living people)
Odisha MLAs 2019–2024